The NATO Rapid Deployable Corps – Italy (NRDC-ITA) is a multi-national corps headquarters of the Italian Army. It was established in November 2001 as a High Readiness Force (HRF) of NATO. The staff of NRDC-ITA is located in Solbiate Olona, a few kilometers northwest of Milan.

History
In 1997, in the wake of a major restructuring of the Italian Army, the 3rd Army Corps was transformed into the Projection Forces Command (COMFOP) in command and control of three brigades, which were characterized by high mobility and deployability. However already on 1 December 2000 the 3rd Army Corps ceded its last brigades to the 1st Defence Forces Command (COMFOD 1°) and with its personnel the NATO Rapid Deployable Italian Corps was raised in January 2001.

From its establishment until its deployment in Afghanistan, NRDC-IT has participated in the following exercises:
 Lion Start (5 to 8 February 2002, Solbiate Olona)
 Spear Head (16 to 25 April 2002, Ramstein, Germany)
 Hot Red Fire (11 to 14 June 2002, Solbiate Olona, Turbigo, La Conigliera)
 Eagle Flight (2 September to 15 October 2002, Civitavecchia)
 Light Ship (3 to 13 December 2002, Civitavecchia)
 Sharp Dagger (21 April to 2 May 2003, Wildflecken, Germany)
 Northern Light (15 to 26 September 2003, Luce Bay, Scotland)
 Roman Warrior (10 to 27 November 2003, Solbiate Olona, Varese)
 Eagle Landing (15 March to 2 April 2004, Legnano, Novara, Solbiate Olona)
 Allied Action (1 May to 8 June 2004, Civitavecchia and Monteromano)
 Eagle Recce (27 to 31 July 2004, Cameri, Vergiate, Solbiate Olona)
 Destined Glory (28 September to 15 October 2004, Cagliari and Capo Teulada)
 Ready to Move (25 October to 26 November 2004, Solbiate Olona)
 Eagle Focus 1-2-3 (25 January to 28 February 2005, Solbiate Olona)
 Eagle Action (6 to 14 May 2005, Solbiate Olona)
 Eagle Thunder (7 to 23 June 2005, Stavanger, Norway)

Structure
NRDC-IT is operationally led by NATO's Joint Force Command Headquarters in Naples or Brunssum. Its staff comprises soldiers from 18 NATO member states, but the Commander and a large part of the staff are Italian. Normally, the Corps commands only a support brigade, but it can command further support units as well as a number of divisions or brigades.

  NATO Rapid Deployable Corps – Italy, in Solbiate Olona (Lombardy)
  NRDC-ITA Support Brigade, in Solbiate Olona (Lombardy)
  1st Signal Regiment, in Milan (Lombardy)
  Battalion "Spluga"
  Battalion "Sempione"
  33rd Logistic and Tactical Support Regiment "Ambrosiano", in Solbiate Olona (Lombardy)

References

External links
 NRDC-IT Homepage

Corps of Italy
Military units and formations established in 2001
Army units and formations of Italy post-1946
2001 establishments in Italy
NATO Rapid Deployable Corps